Mount Carmel Cemetery may refer to: 

 Mount Carmel Cemetery (Hillside, Illinois), burial site of Chicago's Roman Catholic archbishops and some organized crime figures
 Mount Carmel Cemetery (Wyandotte, Michigan)
 Mount Carmel Cemetery (Queens, New York) is a Jewish cemetery that opened in 1906
 Mt. Carmel Cemetery (Lincoln, Nebraska)
 Mt. Carmel Cemetery (Philadelphia)

See also
 Old Mt. Carmel Cemetery, Wrought-Iron Cross Site